Darwin Township may refer to the following townships in the United States:

 Darwin Township, Clark County, Illinois
 Darwin Township, Meeker County, Minnesota